Aghaloo is a civil parish in County Tyrone, Northern Ireland. It is situated in the historic barony of Dungannon Lower.

The Parish contains the following towns and villages:
Aughnacloy
Caledon
Carnteel

The Parish contains the following 68 townlands:

 

A
Aghenis, Annacramp, Annagh, Annagh More, Annaghroe, Annaghsallagh, Ards

B
Ballagh, Ballyboy, Ballyvaddy, Bohard

C
Caledon, Carricklongfield, Cavanboy, Creevelough, Crilly, Cronghill, Culligan, Cumber, Curlagh

D
Demesne, Derrycourtney, Derrygooly, Derrykintone, Derrylappen, Dromore, Drumearn, Drumess, Drummond, Dunmacmay, Dyan

E
Edenageeragh, Enagh

F
Finglush

G
Glasdrummond, Glenarb, Glencrew, Glendavagh, Glenkeen, Guiness

K
Kedew, Kilgowney, Killynaul, Kilmore, Kilsampson, Kilsannagh, Knockaginny, Knocknaroy

L
Lairakean, Legane, Lismulladown

M
Millberry, Mullaghmore East, Mullaghmore West, Mullaghmossagh, Mullintor, Mullycarnan, Mullynaveagh, Mullyneill, Mulnahorn

R
Ramaket, Rehaghy

S
Stragrane

T
Tannagh, Tannaghlane, Tullyblety, Tullnashane, Tullyremon

See also
List of civil parishes of County Tyrone
List of townlands in County Tyrone

References